Mukundan Chembakasseriyil Menon(21 November 1948 - 12 December 2005), born at Chembakassery Veedu in Wadakkanchery in Thrissur district, was a human-rights activist in India. He helped found a number of India's national non-governmental human rights organisations including PUCL and National Confederation of Human Rights Organisations (NCHRO) in Kerala.

Personal life 

Menon was born on 21 November 1948 at Chembakassery Veedu in Wadakkanchery in Thrissur district, then part of the Kingdom of Kochi, which had joined the Indian Union just a year prior. He was the youngest son of Pulippara Achutha Menon and Chembakassery Kalyanikutty Amma. His siblings were Saraswathi, Parvathi, Prof. Sulochana, (all late) Kamalam, Kumari,  Gangadhara Menon and Aravindaksha Menon. He completed his studies at a local school and later at St. Thomas College, Thrissur. He married Lalitha Samuel in 1973, and their marriage produced three sons - Ashim, Amith and Amar. Unfortunately, Lalitha died in 1986 after giving birth to Amar, and eight years later, Menon got remarried to Rema from Thiruvananthapuram.

Career 

After graduation he moved to Delhi, he worked as a freelance journalist in Delhi in 1969–70. He formed the Association for Protection of Democratic Rights (APDR) and started a public awareness campaign in Delhi. He was the Delhi State secretary of the PUCL, and one of its founding members. During 1981 to 1993, as an investigative journalist based in Hyderabad, he successfully revealed many breaking stories. From 1994, Menon was the active voice of human rights movements in Kerala. He was elected secretary of the National Confederation of Human Rights Organisations(NCHRO), an umbrella organisation of human rights groups in 1997. He was working closely with Human Rights Watch(USA), People's Watch (Tamil Nadu), SICHREM(Bangalore) and was a regular columnist to Al Jazeera, Rediff News, Indian Currents, Milligazzette and Meantime. In 1999, he received a Human Rights Award from Middle East Malayali Association.

He was working in Delhi during the 1970s as a journalist, and was actively involved in human- rights activities. During the 1990s, he settled in Kerala. However, he didn't stop his activism. He pursued journalism with Thejas Fortnightly, and ultimately became an editorial consultant and the Resident Editor of Thejas Daily.

He was a regular contributor to The Milli Gazette also. Dr.Zafarul Islam Khan, editor of The Milli Gazette upon learning of Menon's death, said, "We are shocked to know of the untimely demise of our friend Mr. Mukundan C. Menon. He was a great fighter for human and civil rights in this country". He died on 12 December 2005.

He would be best remembered for the role he played as a free media journalist. Menon who wrote against hindutva fascism have been accused of being terrorist sympathiser by sangh parivar dominated media. He was jailed during the infamous emergency period. As a human rights activist, Menon presented the cases of numerous political prisoners and sought justice in many high-profile cases including of Abdul Nasar Maudani. He vigorously condemned the responsibility of the security forces in human rights violations and the high level of impunity which benefits those responsible for human rights violations. NCHRO institutes Mukundan C.Menon Award annually, which is an award to human right activists in the memory of Mukundan C. Menon

Human rights advocate

Live reporting of massacres in Bagalpur (1980), massacres of Sikhs (1984),Acted as a mediator when Ayyangali Army took the Palakkad District Collector hostage on 4 October 1996, Voiced against Ma'dani's arrest for the first time 1 April 1998. Then he filed petition to National Human Rights Commission,Chief Minister of Tamil Nadu Karunanidhi, Central Interior Minister and Prime Minister etc.:, Recipient of Human Rights Award conferred by Middle East Malayali Association 1999,Actively involved voicing against Police atrocities and issues related to tribal people, Dalits and backward communities,Brought to limelight issues like police excesses of Killing, killing of Javed a Malayali in Gujarat, death of Tangal Kunju in Police custody in Alappuzha and several others human rights violations

Mukundan C. Menon worked in the Association for the Protection of Democratic Rights in Delhi for the release of the prisoners of the CPI-ML and the campaign to save the lives of the two tribals Kista Gowda and Bhoomaiah who were ultimately hanged during the emergency. This work led to his own incarceration in the emergency years (1975–77). He edited the journal Third World Unity after his release between 1978 and 1980 which became a rallying point for the adherents of the theory of the three worlds which was embraced by the principal revolutionary trends at that time. As the Delhi State secretary of the PUCL his work was instrumental in paving the way for the Supreme Court directive that the death penalty be awarded only in the rarest of the rare cases. His commitment to the human rights movement continued subsequently in Hyderabad and Thiruvananthapuram where he worked as a journalist.

Mukundan C Menon award

The award was instituted in honour of Menon soon after his death in 2006 by the National Confederation of Human Rights Organisations. The annual award is given to human rights defenders, artists, writer & environmental activists actively involved in defending the rights of the people. The 2012 award was presented to the Anti-Kudankulam nuclear plant activist, Dr Udayukumar. The commentator, renowned writer and rights activist Ram Puniyani was awarded NCHRO's Mukundan C Menon Award 2015. The 2018 award was presented to Dalit journalist and editor of Dalit Voice, V.T. Rajshekar. In 2019, it was awarded to Delhi University Professor GN Saibaba, and the 2020 award was given to jailed priest and human rights activist Father Stan Swamy.

References

Activists from Kerala
Malayali people
Journalists from Kerala
1948 births
2005 deaths
Indian human rights activists
People from Thrissur district
20th-century Indian journalists